Microlinices is a genus of predatory sea snails, marine gastropod mollusks in the subfamily [unassigned] Naticidae of the family Naticidae, the moon snails.

Species
Species within the genus Microlinices include:
 Microlinices apiculus Simone, 2014
 Microlinices benthovus Simone, 2014
 Microlinices gaiophanis Simone, 2014
 Microlinices ibitingus Simone, 2014
 Microlinices latiusculus Simone, 2014
 Microlinices ombratus Simone, 2014

References

External links
 
 Simone, L. R. L. (2014). Taxonomic study on the molluscs collected during the Marion-Dufresne expedition (MD55) off SE Brazil: the Naticidae (Mollusca: Caenogastropoda). Zoosystema. 36(3): 563-593

Naticidae